Flight 840 may refer to

TWA Flight 840 hijacking, a hijacking in 1969
TWA Flight 840 bombing, a bombing in 1986

0840